Rising Sun Party (RIS) was a political party in the Indian state of Sikkim. The founder and president was Ram Chandra Poudyal (R. C. Poudyal) who was one of the leaders from Sikkim Congress (Revolutionary). 

In 1989 Sikkim Legislative Assembly election and Sikkim Lok Sabha election, RIS was one of the main rivals for the ruling party, Sikkim Sangram Parishad (SSP). But in this Legislative Assembly election, RIS couldn’t win any seat and received only 8.59% (8.88% in seats contested) votes. In Lok Sabha election, R. C. Powdyal stood as the candidate of RIS, but he lost and couldn’t refund his deposit of candidacy.

Since 1990, RIS didn’t participate any election in Sikkim, and it isn’t registered in the list of political parties in Sikkim by Election Commission of India (ECI).

Electoral records 
 Sikkim Legislative Assembly election

 Lok Sabha election, Sikkim

References

Defunct political parties in Sikkim
Political parties with year of establishment missing